ChocQuibTown is a Colombian hip-hop group.

Awards

Grammy Awards

|-
| align="center"|2011
| align="center"|Oro
| align="center"|Best Latin Rock, Alternative or Urban Album
|
|-
| align="center"|2015
| align="center"|Behind the Machine
| align="center"|Best Latin Rock, Alternative or Urban Album
|
|}

Latin Grammy Awards
A Latin Grammy Award is an accolade by the Latin Academy of Recording Arts & Sciences to recognize outstanding achievement in the music industry.

|-
| align="center"|2009
| align="center"|ChocQuibTown
| align="center"|Best New Artist
|
|-
| align="center"|2010
| align="center"|"De Donde Vengo Yo"
| align="center"|Best Alternative Song
|
|-
| align="center" rowspan="3"|2012
| align="center"|"Calentura" (featuring Tego Calderón & Zully Murillo)
| align="center"|Record of the Year
|
|-
| align="center"|Eso Es Lo Que Hay
| align="center"|Album of the Year
|
|-
| align="center"|Eso Es Lo Que Hay
| align="center"|Best Alternative Music Album
|
|-
| align="center" rowspan="1"|2014
| align="center"|"El Mar de Sus Ojos" <small>(featuring Carlos Vives)
| align="center"|Record of the Year
|
|-
| align="center" rowspan="1"|2015
| align="center"|"El Mismo" 
| align="center"|Best Tropical Fusion Album
|
|}

Premios Nuestra Tierra
A Premio Nuestra Tierra is an accolade that recognizes outstanding achievement in the Colombian music industry. ChocQuibTown has been nominated six times and received four awards.

|-
| align="center"|2011
| align="center"|ChocQuibTown
| align="center"|Best Artist of the Year
|
|-
| align="center"|2011
| align="center"|"De Donde Vengo Yo"
| align="center"|Best Urban Interpretation of the Year
|
|-
| align="center"|2011
| align="center"|ChocQuibTown
| align="center"|Best Urban Solo Artist or Group of the Year
|
|-
| align="center"|2011
| align="center"|"De Donde Vengo Yo"
| align="center"|Best Folk Interpretation of the Year
|
|-
| align="center"|2014
| align="center"|Behind the Machine
| align="center"|Album of the Year
|
|-
| align="center"|2011
| align="center"|"Uh La La"
| align="center"|Best Alternative Performance
|
|}

Premios Shock (Colombia)

|-
| align="center"|2010
| align="center"|ChocQuibTown
| align="center"|Best Group of the Year
|
|-
| align="center"|2010
| align="center"|Goyo (for Oro)
| align="center"|Voice of the Year
|
|-
| align="center"|2011
| align="center"|ChocQuibTown
| align="center"|Artist of the Year
|
|}

Premios Lo Nuestro (Americas)

|-
| align="center"|2011
| align="center"|"De Donde Vengo Yo"
| align="center"|Best Video
|
|}

References

ChocQuibTown
ChocQuibTown